Michael Columbus Driscoll (October 19, 1892 – March 22, 1953) was an American professional baseball pitcher with the Philadelphia Athletics during the  season. He was born in North Abington, Massachusetts and attended the University of Maine, where he played college baseball for the Black Bears in the 1910s. He died in 1953 and was buried in Easton, Massachusetts.

References

External links

Major League Baseball pitchers
Philadelphia Athletics players
Baseball players from Massachusetts
People from Abington, Massachusetts
Sportspeople from Plymouth County, Massachusetts
Maine Black Bears baseball players
1892 births
1953 deaths
burials in Massachusetts